"Which Way, Robert Frost" recorded with the title Zhǎo Duì Nǐ 找對你 (Looking for you) is a song by Jacky Cheung (Cantonese pinyin: Hok Yau)（中文名：张学友）, written by Roxanne Seeman and Philipp Steinke for Cheung’s Private Corner album.  The title and lyrics refer to the narrative poem "The Road Not Taken" written by the American poet Robert Frost. The lyrics were adapted into Cantonese by Kenny So (乔星 Qiao Xing). It was released on January 29, 2010, by Universal Music. 

Jacky Cheung performed "Zhǎo Duì Nǐ 找對你 (Looking for you)" at his Private Corner Mini Concert at the Hong Kong Jockey Club on April 30. Cheung's Private Corner Mini Concert DVD was released on July 23, 2010.

Composition and lyrical inspiration 

The title and theme makes reference to the Robert Frost poem "The Road Not Taken". The inspiration for the writing of the lyrics came from the sentiments that Seeman felt, after attending a screening of the Disney/Pixar animated movie "Up". Roxanne Seeman provided an explanation of the concept and writing of the lyrics for the song to be adapted into Cantonese language.  Kenny So was the author chosen to write the Cantonese adaptation.

The song is a waltz.

Style 
Zhǎo Duì Nǐ 找對你 (Looking for you) is a song in the style of “Canto-jazz”, a genre coined by Jacky Cheung for the style of songs on Private Corner, his first jazz album.

Recording and production 
Zhǎo Duì Nǐ 找對你 (Looking for you) by Jacky Cheung was produced by Andrew Tuason (杜自持). The rhythm section was recorded in Malaysia. Tollak Ollestad is featured on harmonica. His harmonica part was recorded in the Netherlands. Cheung's vocals were recorded in Hong Kong.

Critical reception 
Tencent described the swaying sketch with harmonica as the main accompaniment, writing "the many semitones in the tune, show a unique sentiment in Jacky Cheung’s interpretation."

Tencent rated Finding the Right You (Zhǎo Duì Nǐ 找對你 (Looking for you)) as best composition on the Private Corner album explaining that Jacky Cheung is called "God of Songs" because he can sing a slow ballad "straight into people's hearts". The song was described as being the one that "most easily reaches into people's hearts intoxicatingly touching their souls. In the case of excellent lyrics, music, arrangement, and production, the composition is even more outstanding because this song can capture the key to the human heart."

Live performances and usage in other media 
Cheung performed "Looking for you (Which Way, Robert Frost)" at his Private Corner Mini Concert held at the Polytechnic University Hong Kong Jockey Club on April 30. The show was taped, with the Private Corner Mini Concert DVD releasing July 23, 2010.

Credits and personnel 
Credits are adapted from the album's liner notes.
 Jacky Cheung – lead vocals
 Andrew Tuason (杜自持) – arranger, piano, conductor
 Ted Lo – arranger, strings
 Lewis Pragasam – drums
 Andy Peterson  – electric bass
 Tollak Ollestad – featuring, harmonica
 Sham Kamikaze – guitar
 Kenny So (乔星 Qiao Xing)  – Cantonese lyrics
 Roxanne Seeman – songwriter
 Philipp Steinke – songwriter
 Steve Thornton – percussion
 Beijing Love Orchestra – strings

Paolo Onesa version

"Which Way, Robert Frost?" was recorded by Paolo Onesa in English on his Pop Goes Standards album, released on Valentine’s Day, February 17, 2014, by MCA Music, Philippines. It was produced by Francis Guevarra.

The track is included in The Crossover Cafe II compilation album released by Universal Music, alongside songs by Norah Jones, Maroon 5, Marvin Gaye, Stevie Wonder and others.

In BusinessWorld Online, Jeffrey O. Valisno described the song as having "“romantic” written all over it" saying "Mr. Onesa sings like a guy smitten with a lovely girl while paying a tribute to the American poet of “The Road Not Taken.”

Awards
"Which Way, Robert Frost?" received multiple Awit Award nominations at the 28th Awit Awards:

 Best Performance By A Male Recording Artist, Paolo Onesa

 Best Musical Arrangement, Benjie Pating

 Best Vocal Arrangement, Arnie Mendaros

 Best Engineered Recording, Ferdie Marquez & Efren San Pedro, Freq Studio & 12 Stone Studio

References

External links 

 
 

2010 songs
Jacky Cheung songs
Songs written by Roxanne Seeman
Songs written by Philipp Steinke
Cantonese-language songs
Songs about nostalgia
Songs based on poems
Songs about writers
Waltzes